Aydınpınar may refer to:

 Aydınpınar, Düzce
 Aydınpınar, Kahta
 Aydınpınar, Mudanya